GIAN may stand for:

 Give it a Name, an annual rock music festival in Britain
 Geneva International Academic Network, founded by the University of Geneva, subsumed in 2007 by the Swiss Network for International Studies (SNIS), which assumes its mission, rights and responsibilities